The Ontario Liberal Party is one of three major political parties in Ontario, Canada running in the 2011 Ontario provincial election. The Ontario Liberals have governed the province since 2003, and currently forms a minority government in the Legislative Assembly of Ontario with 47 out of 107 seats.

By-elections

References

2011
Liberal